Kate Margareth Jobson (later Davies; born 8 July 1937) is a retired Swedish freestyle swimmer who won the 1958 European title in the 100 m event. The same year she received a Swedish sportswoman of the year award (Årets idrottskvinna). She competed at the 1956 Summer Olympics in the 100 m and 4×100 m events and finished sixth in the relay.

References

1937 births
Living people
Swedish female freestyle swimmers
Olympic swimmers of Sweden
Swimmers at the 1956 Summer Olympics
European Aquatics Championships medalists in swimming
People from Varberg
Sportspeople from Halland County
20th-century Swedish women